The Bereft (Persian: Bipanah) is a 1953 Iranian film directed by George Obadiah.

References

Bibliography 
 Mohammad Ali Issari. Cinema in Iran, 1900-1979. Scarecrow Press, 1989.

External links 
 

1953 films
1950s Persian-language films
1953 drama films
Iranian drama films
Iranian black-and-white films